The 1964–65 season saw Rochdale compete for their 6th consecutive season in the Football League Fourth Division.

Statistics
																												
																												

|}

Final League Table

Competitions

Football League Fourth Division

F.A. Cup

League Cup

Lancashire Cup

Rose Bowl

References

Rochdale A.F.C. seasons
Rochdale